Pond Branch is a stream in Madison County in the U.S. state of Missouri. It is a tributary of the Castor River.

Pond Branch was named for the fact its headwaters were fed from a pond.

See also
List of rivers of Missouri

References

Rivers of Madison County, Missouri
Rivers of Missouri